Norman Ettlinger  (20 January 1920 – 1979), was an English actor who appeared in  Rumpole of the Bailey as his colleague Percy Hoskins. He also played many other roles, both on stage and screen. He notably portrayed Boardman Wyatt in the original Broadway cast of the Donaldson Award  and Outer Critics Circle Award winning play Billy Budd (1951) by Louis O. Coxe and Robert H. Chapman.

He appeared in an episode ('Keeley's Cousin', season 1 episode 29) of The Forest Rangers TV show, where he played Major Nigel Keeley.

He died in 1979.

Notes

External links

1920 births
English male radio actors
English male stage actors
English male television actors
1979 deaths